The 2013–14 season will be Lombard-Pápa TFC's 7th competitive season, 5th consecutive season in the OTP Bank Liga and 18th year in existence as a football club.

First team squad

Transfers

Summer

In:

Out:

Winter

In:

Out:

List of Hungarian football transfers summer 2013
List of Hungarian football transfers winter 2013–14

Statistics

Appearances and goals
Last updated on 1 June 2014.

|-
|colspan="14"|Youth players:

|-
|colspan="14"|Out to loan:

|-
|colspan="14"|Players no longer at the club:

|}

Top scorers
Includes all competitive matches. The list is sorted by shirt number when total goals are equal.

Last updated on 1 June 2014

Disciplinary record
Includes all competitive matches. Players with 1 card or more included only.

Last updated on 1 June 2014

Overall
{|class="wikitable"
|-
|Games played || 45 (30 OTP Bank Liga, 5 Hungarian Cup and 10 Hungarian League Cup)
|-
|Games won || 16 (9 OTP Bank Liga, 2 Hungarian Cup and 5 Hungarian League Cup)
|-
|Games drawn || 11 (6 OTP Bank Liga, 2 Hungarian Cup and 3 Hungarian League Cup)
|-
|Games lost || 18 (15 OTP Bank Liga, 1 Hungarian Cup and 2 Hungarian League Cup)
|-
|Goals scored || 59
|-
|Goals conceded || 72
|-
|Goal difference || -13
|-
|Yellow cards || 128
|-
|Red cards || 8
|-
|rowspan="1"|Worst discipline ||  Gábor Tóth (16 , 1 )
|-
|rowspan="2"|Best result || 5–1 (A) v Kecskemét – Ligakupa – 22-02-2014
|-
| 4–0 (H) v Kecskemét – Ligakupa – 04-03-2014
|-
|rowspan="4"|Worst result || 0–4 (A) v Ferencváros – Ligakupa – 19-03-2014
|-
| 0–4 (A) v Ferencváros – OTP Bank Liga – 19-03-2014
|-
| 1–5 (H) v Debrecen – OTP Bank Liga – 04-05-2014
|-
| 0–4 (A) v Paks – OTP Bank Liga – 17-05-2014
|-
|rowspan="1"|Most appearances ||  Lajos Szűcs (36 appearances)
|-
|rowspan="1"|Top scorer ||  Georges Griffiths (11 goals)
|-
|Points || 59/135 (43.7%)
|-

Nemzeti Bajnokság I

Matches

Classification

Results summary

Results by round

Hungarian Cup

League Cup

Group stage

Classification

Knockout phase

Pre-season

References

External links
 Eufo
 Official Website
 UEFA
 fixtures and results

Lombard-Pápa TFC seasons
Hungarian football clubs 2013–14 season